Morobe may refer to several places in Papua New Guinea:
Morobe Province
Morobe, Papua New Guinea
Morobe Rural LLG in Papua New Guinea
Morobe Goldfield (Wau) 
Morobe Bay